Oleta Adams (born May 4, 1953) is an American singer and pianist. She found limited success during the early 1980s, before gaining fame via her contributions to Tears for Fears's international chart-topping album The Seeds of Love (1989). Her albums Circle of One (1991) and Evolution (1993) were top 10 hits in the UK; the former yielded a Grammy-nominated cover of Brenda Russell's "Get Here", which was a top 5 hit in both the UK and the US. Adams has been nominated for four Grammy Awards, as well as two Soul Train Music Awards.

Biography
Adams was born the daughter of a preacher and was raised listening to gospel music. In her youth, her family moved to Yakima, Washington, which is sometimes shown as her place of birth. She got her musical start in the church.

Before gaining her opportunity to perform, Adams faced a great deal of rejection. In the 1970s, she moved to Los Angeles, California, where she recorded a demo tape. However, many music executives were exclusively interested in disco music rather than Adams' preferred style.

With the advice of her singing coach, Lee Farrell, Adams moved to Kansas City, Missouri, where she did a variety of local gigs. She started her career in the early 1980s with two self-financed albums, which had limited success.

Oleta Adams sang the National Anthem prior to Game Two of the 1984 American League Championship Series.

Collaboration with Tears for Fears
In 1985, Adams was discovered by Roland Orzabal and Curt Smith, founders of the English band Tears for Fears, while she was performing in the Peppercorn Duck Club at the Hyatt Hotel in Kansas City, while they were on a US tour. Soon after, Adams stopped performing in hotels and had started to look for alternative employment. In 1987, Orzabal and Smith contacted her to invite her to join their band as a singer and pianist on their next album, The Seeds of Love. A year later she participated in two sessions while she toured the Nordic countries.

In 1989, the album was released and the single "Woman in Chains", sung as a duet by Adams and Orzabal and with Phil Collins on drums, became her first hit. Adams embarked on a world tour with Tears For Fears in 1990, performing by herself as the supporting artist at the start of each show, and remaining onstage throughout the Tears For Fears set where she would provide piano and vocals.

1990s
Following her work with Tears For Fears, Adams was offered a recording contract by their label, Fontana Records, and restarted her solo career in 1990. After meeting a number of producers, she worked with Orzabal, who co-produced her new album, Circle of One. The album received acclaim, and eventually peaked at No. 1 in the UK Albums Chart in 1991, after she scored her biggest hit to date with a Grammy nominated cover of Brenda Russell's "Get Here". The song reached the UK and US top 5 and became popular during the 1991 Gulf War conflict, as families of deployed troops in the region embraced the tune as a theme song.
1991 also saw Adams sign to independent music publisher Fairwood Music, and contribute to the Elton John/Bernie Taupin tribute album Two Rooms, on which appeared her version of John's 1974 hit "Don't Let the Sun Go Down On Me". Adams' version became another top 40 hit in the UK.

Her next album, Evolution (1993), was also a commercial success, making the UK top 10. It also featured her self-penned adult contemporary single "Window of Hope". Her 1995 release, Moving On, saw Adams move more in the direction of R&B, and she also reunited with Roland Orzabal for the duet "Me and My Big Ideas", on the Tears For Fears album, Raoul and the Kings of Spain, the same year. Two years later, she released the Christian themed album  Come Walk with Me, where she received a nomination for a Grammy Award for "Holy Is the Lamb" in 1997.

In 1998, she toured as a guest vocalist on Phil Collins's Big Band Jazz Tour.

2000s
In 2001, Adams released her sixth album, All the Love, a return to an R&B/Adult contemporary sound. The album was re-released in 2004 in Germany with a different title I Can't Live a Day without You.

In 2004, Adams reunited with Tears for Fears once again as she made a surprise guest appearance onstage at their Kansas City concert, performing "Woman in Chains".

On October 3, 2006, Adams released her first Christmas album, entitled Christmas Time with Oleta.

On April 21, 2009, Adams released her eighth album entitled Let's Stay Here.

2010s
On February 10, 2017, Adams released her ninth album, her first album in eight years, entitled Third Set.

Personal life
In 1994, Adams married drummer John Cushon at a United Methodist church in Kansas City, where they both taught Sunday School. They met in 1980 while working on a demo tape for Adams. Adams stated that she never had a passion to get married but on January 17, 1994 she and Cushon were involved in the Los Angeles earthquake. Adams referred to this as a sign from God that she was ready to get married.

Discography

Studio albums
1982: Untitled
1983: Going on Record
1990: Circle of One
1993: Evolution
1995: Moving On
1997: Come Walk with Me
2001: All the Love
2006: Christmas Time with Oleta
2009: Let's Stay Here
2017: Third Set

Compilations
1996: The Very Best of Oleta Adams
2004: The Ultimate Collection

Awards and nominations

References

External links 

 

Fairwood Music (UK) Ltd. Website
Oleta Adams 2016 Podcast Interview at Soulinterviews.com

1953 births
Living people
20th-century African-American women singers
20th-century Methodists
21st-century African-American women singers
21st-century Methodists
American contraltos
American gospel singers
American soul singers
MNRK Music Group artists
Fontana Records artists
Mercury Records artists
Musicians from Seattle
People from Yakima, Washington
Singers from Washington (state)
Performers of Christian contemporary R&B music
Urban contemporary gospel musicians
African-American Methodists
American United Methodists
Ballad musicians